Ramakrishna Paramahamsa (1836–1886) is a famous nineteenth-century Bengali mystic. Ramakrishna was a teacher of popular appeal, speaking in rustic Bengali with stories and parables. Ramakrishna's main teachings included God realization as the supreme goal of life, renunciation of Kama-Kanchana, Harmony of Religions and Jiva is Shiva. Key concepts in Ramakrishna's teachings included the oneness of existence and the unity and truth of all religions.

God-realisation
Ramakrishna  noted that God-realisation is the supreme goal of all living beings. Ramakrishna's mystical experiences through different religions led him to teach that various religions are different means to reach absolute knowledge and bliss—and that the different religions cannot express the totality of absolute truth, but can express aspects of it.

Kama-Kanchana
Ramakrishna taught that the primal bondage in human life is Kama-Kanchana (lust and gold). When speaking to men, Ramakrishna warned them against kamini-kanchana, or "women and gold",

When speaking to women, he warned them against purusha-kanchana, or "man and gold." Gauri Ma, one of Ramakrishna's prominent women disciples, said that:

Avidyamaya and vidyamaya

Devotees believe that Ramakrishna's realisation of nirvikalpa samadhi also led him to an understanding of the two sides of maya, or illusion, to which he referred as Avidyamaya and vidyamaya. He explained that avidyamaya represents dark forces of creation (e.g. sensual desire, evil passions, greed, lust and cruelty), which keep people on lower planes of consciousness. These forces are responsible for human entrapment in the cycle of birth and death, and they must be fought and vanquished. Vidyamaya, on the other hand, represents higher forces of creation (e.g. spiritual virtues, enlightening qualities, kindness, purity, love, and devotion), which elevate human beings to the higher planes of consciousness.

Harmony of religions

Ramakrishna recognised differences among religions but realised that in spite of these differences, all religions lead to the same ultimate goal, and hence they are all valid and true. Amiya P. Sen writes that the deep foundations in bhakti or devotion and faith in God makes Ramakrishna's teachings look universalistic and not his culturally determined forms. The distinguished British historian Arnold J. Toynbee has written: “... Mahatma Gandhi’s principle of non-violence and Sri Ramakrishna’s testimony to the harmony of religions: here we have the attitude and the spirit that can make it possible for the human race to grow together into a single family–and in the Atomic Age, this is the only alternative to destroying ourselves.”

Regarding Harmony of Religions, Ramakrishna said,

Jiva is Shiva and other teachings
Ramakrishna's proclamation of jatra jiv tatra Shiv (wherever there is a living being, there is Shiva) stemmed from his Advaitic perception of Reality. This taught his disciples, "Jive daya noy, Shiv gyane jiv seba" (not kindness to living beings, but serving the living being as Shiva Himself). According to scholars, Vivekananda derived his inspiration from this message and took initiative in social activities like famine relief, pm on maintenance of orphanages, opening of training centers, educational institutions, dispensaries and the like—"Where should you go to seek for God? Are not all the poor, the miserable, the weak, god? Why not worship them first?...Let these people be your God..." Ramakrishna did not directly participate in social service, but entrusted the task to his chief disciple Vivekananda.

Ramakrishna, though not formally trained as a philosopher, had an intuitive grasp of complex philosophical concepts. According to him brahmanda, the visible universe and many other universes, are mere bubbles emerging out of Brahman, the supreme ocean of consciousness and intelligence.<ref>Gospel of Ramakrishna, vol. 4</ref>

Like Adi Sankara had done more than a thousand years earlier, Ramakrishna Paramahamsa revitalised Hinduism which had been fraught with excessive ritualism and superstition in the nineteenth century and helped it become better-equipped to respond to challenges from Islam, Christianity and the dawn of the modern era. However, unlike Adi Sankara, Ramakrishna developed ideas about the post-samadhi descent of consciousness into the phenomenal world, which he went on to term "Vijñāna". While he asserted the supreme validity of Advaita Vedanta, he also stated that "I accept both the Nitya and the Leela, both the Absolute and the Relative."

Parables
Parables formed a very important part of Ramakrishna's teachings. Ramakrishna conveyed his spiritual and moral messages through tales and parables.The Parable of the Greatest Devotee, is one of his famous parables—The Parable of the Pandit who could not swim is another famous parable of Ramakrishna, a story akin to the fable of the Fox and the Cat''—

See also
 Sri-Sri-Ramakrisna-kathamrta

Notes

Ramakrishna
Ramakrishna Mission